The 7th Grand National Assembly of Turkey existed from 28 February 1943 to 5 August 1946. 
There were 492 MPs in the parliament, all of which were the members of the Republican People's Party (CHP).  But towards the end of the term some issued from CHP to form Democrat Party (DP)

Main parliamentary milestones 
Some of the important events in the history of the parliament are the following:
8 March 1943- İsmet İnönü was reelected as the President of Turkey for the third time.
9 March 1943 –Şükrü Saracoğlu of CHP formed the 14th government of Turkey.
2 August 1944- The parliament decided to suspend Turco-German relations
10 January 1945 –Law 4695: The text of the constitution was revised to replace non Turkish words with the Turkish equivalents.
10 January 1945 – Law 4696 Four Arabic month names were changed to Turkish month names.
23 February – Parliament approved declaration of war to Germany and Japan  
12 June – Motion with four signatures: An important step in Turkish democracy. Four CHP MPs called for a change in party regulations 
15 August 1945 – The parliament approved the United Nations principle agreement.
20 November 1945 - President İsmet İnönü called for an opposition party
1 December 1945- Celal Bayar, a former prime minister (1937-1939) announced that he’ll found a new party.
7 January 1946 –Democrat Party (DP) was founded by Celal Bayar, Fuat Köprülü, Adnan Menderes and Refik Koraltan.
31 May 1046 – New election system (direct suffrage)
15 June 1946 – Law 4936: Universities became autonomous
21 July – General Elections

References

1943 establishments in Turkey
1946 disestablishments in Turkey
07
7th parliament of Turkey
Republican People's Party (Turkey)
Democrat Party (Turkey, 1946–1961)
Political history of Turkey